Sasan is a village located at Una Tehsil of Una district in the state of Himachal Pradesh, India. The village is one of the populous villages of Himachal Pradesh.

Demographics
The village has a population of 1314 people, of which 661 are males and 653 are females as per 2011 Indian Census.

References

Villages in Una district